Bells is a live album by American free jazz saxophonist Albert Ayler recorded at The Town Hall in New York City in 1965 and first released as a single sided LP on the ESP-Disk label. The album was released in many variations including clear and coloured vinyl and with a variety of colored covers and most recently on CD combined with Prophecy.

Reception

The Allmusic review by Michael G. Nastos states: "As Albert Ayler recorded several definitive recordings before or after this one, and due to the very short length of Bells, it cannot be considered a magnum opus. But it does contain music played by his most powerful unit, a small window into the mind and heart of the most iconic maverick in the free jazz movement, and a magnet for discussion that lingers on well past his death".

The authors of The Penguin Guide to Jazz awarded the album 3 stars, stating that it was "a token that here was music so powerful you'd probably only manage 20 minutes of it before switching off the hi-fi and taking deep gulps of air."

All About Jazz commented: "Part of the lasting brilliance of Bells is that the group is much more roughshod at this early stage, the ensemble not yet formed into a cohesive, balanced whole but a rickety patchwork, its seams (and therefore process) showing proudly through".

Track listing
All compositions by Albert Ayler
 "Bells" - 20:03

Personnel
Albert Ayler - tenor saxophone 
Donald Ayler - trumpet
Charles Tyler - alto saxophone
Lewis Worrell - bass
Sonny Murray - drums

References

1965 live albums
Albert Ayler live albums
ESP-Disk live albums